Leiv Kjøllmoen (15 July 1930 – 8 April 2015) was a Norwegian politician for the Labour Party.

He served as a deputy representative to the Parliament of Norway from Rogaland during the terms 1977–1981 and 1981–1985. In total he met during 70 days of parliamentary session. He was a labourer and trade unionist at Karmøy Fabrikker, Norsk Hydro's plant at Karmøy.

References

1930 births
2015 deaths
People from Karmøy
Deputy members of the Storting
Labour Party (Norway) politicians
Rogaland politicians
Norwegian trade unionists